Siesta Key is a barrier island off the southwest coast of the U.S. state of Florida, located between Roberts Bay and the Gulf of Mexico. A portion of it lies within the city boundary of Sarasota, but the majority of the key is a census-designated place (CDP) in Sarasota County. Siesta Key is part of the Bradenton–Sarasota–Venice Metropolitan Statistical Area.

History
From the 19th century to the early 20th century, Siesta Key was known by a variety of names, including "Little Sarasota Key" and "Sarasota Key". The first attempts to develop the key were by the Siesta Land Company in 1907 consisting of Harry Higel, Captain Louis Roberts, and E. M. Arbogast. The company platted the northern end of the key as "Siesta on the Gulf" as well as dredged bayous and built docks. 

The only access to Siesta Key was by boat or ferry until the first bridge connecting it to the mainland was completed in 1917. The bridge was later replaced in 1927 along with an addition of a second bridge located on the southern end of the key. The entire key was officially recognized as "Siesta Key" by 1952.

Geography

Siesta Key is made up of four main districts: Siesta Beach, Crescent Beach, Turtle Beach, and Siesta Key Village. It contains a suburban residential area located on the Siesta Key barrier island on the West coast of Florida, just west of the town of Sarasota. The community on Siesta Key consists of single family homes, condominiums, retail shops and art galleries.

Beaches 
Beaches on Siesta Key include Siesta Beach, Crescent Beach, and Turtle Beach. Siesta Beach was named #1 in the U.S. and #11 in the world in the 2020 TripAdvisor Travelers' Choice™ awards.

Demographics

The population of Siesta Key was 6,565 at the 2010 US Census.

At the time of the 2000 US Census, there were 7,150 people, 3,783 households, and 2,273 families residing in the CDP. There were 3,783 households, out of which 9.9% had children under the age of 18 living with them, 54.9% were married couples living together, 3.7% had a female householder with no husband present, and 39.9% were non-families. Of all households 33.9% were made up of individuals, and 17.9% had someone living alone who was 65 years of age or older. The average household size was 1.89 and the average family size was 2.34.

In the CDP, the population was spread out, with 9.0% under the age of 18, 1.8% from 18 to 24, 15.6% from 25 to 44, 33.9% from 45 to 64, and 39.6% who were 65 years of age or older. The median age was 60 years. For every 100 females, there were 90.5 males. For every 100 females age 18 and over, there were 88.9 males.

The median income for a household in the CDP was $66,397, and the median income for a family was $81,345. Males had a median income of $55,240 versus $32,263 for females. The per capita income for the CDP was $53,290. About 3.0% of families and 4.4% of the population were below the poverty line, including 4.1% of those under age 18 and 3.2% of those age 65 or over.

References

 Explore Sarasota and Vicinity, Kenneth F. Tricebock, 1988

External links

 Siesta Key Chamber of Commerce
 Sarasota County government

Census-designated places in Florida
Census-designated places in Sarasota County, Florida
Populated coastal places in Florida on the Gulf of Mexico
Sarasota metropolitan area
Seaside resorts in Florida